Colin Edward Lloyd (born 7 August 1973), nicknamed Jaws, is an English retired professional darts player. He is a former world number one ranked player and has won two major television titles in the Professional Darts Corporation (PDC) – the 2004 World Grand Prix and the 2005 World Matchplay.

PDC career

1999 – 2004 

A former builder, Lloyd broke onto the scene in 1999, making his TV debut the same year, In the first round he beating Scott Cummings 10–8, thrashing Alan Warriner 13–2 in the second round and the Quarter Finals losing to Peter Manley 16–8 of the 1999 PDC World Matchplay. His World Championship debut came in 2000 – but he lost in the first round to Shayne Burgess. After another first round loss at the 2001 World Championships, his major breakthrough was in the 2002 PDC World Championship, where he reached the semi-finals losing to Peter Manley. He had beaten Alex Roy, Warriner and Richie Burnett to reach the semi-finals that established him as one of the top players on the PDC circuit.

2004 – 2006 

His long-awaited first major title came in the 2004 World Grand Prix, where he beat Warriner in the final. His success in the non-televised PDC Pro Tour events saw his world ranking continue to rise. By April 2005 he had reached world number one – a position he held (with a brief interruption in June 2006) for almost two years. Soon after becoming World Number One he added the 2005 World Matchplay title in Blackpool, beating John Part in the final, ending the match on a maximum 170 checkout. He also reached the final of the 2005 World Grand Prix before losing 1–7 to Phil Taylor. This good form made him second favourite in the 2006 World Championship, only behind Taylor in terms of odds. Unfortunately for Lloyd, he was knocked out in the first round by qualifier Gary Welding, having led 2–0 in the best-of-five match. He reached the final of the International Darts League in the Netherlands in May 2006, losing to Raymond van Barneveld.

2006 – 2012 

A heavy 2–11 defeat to Taylor at the 2006 UK Open saw his form in televised events dip dramatically. He lost in the first round of the 2006 Las Vegas Desert Classic to Chris Mason, to Steve Maish (despite a ten-dart leg where he was two darts away from a nine dart finish) at the 2006 World Matchplay and to Bob Anderson in the first round of the World Grand Prix. He lost his world number one ranking after a second round loss to eventual world champion van Barneveld at the 2007 PDC World Championship. He had led 3–0 in sets, failed with four match darts, and eventually lost 3–4.

Lloyd lost in the first round of the 2007 US Open to Jim Widmayer before showing some improvement with a run to the semi-finals of the 2007 UK Open. But he continued to lose ranking places as his good results from the two-year ranking period were replaced with further first round losses to Wes Newton at the 2007 Las Vegas Desert Classic and to Mervyn King at the 2007 World Matchplay.

He went into the 2008 World Championship ranked 12th in the world, having been number one just twelve months previously. He missed a dart at bullseye to win his first round match with Jan van der Rassel and then lost 2–3 (6–4 in legs in the final set). Lloyd's poor form at the 2009 World Championship continued as he lost in straight sets to the Netherlands' Jelle Klaasen in the first round. After winning his first round match at the 2009 World Matchplay against Wayne Jones, Lloyd announced that he had just recovered from swine flu and had been placed in isolation for five days.

Whilst playing Andree Welge in the 2011 PDC World Darts Championship first round, Lloyd punched the dart board out of frustration from letting slip a 2–0 lead to be all square at 2–2. Despite this, he eventually won the match 3–2 with a 116 out shot, and after the match said that he regretted what he did and said it was born out of pure frustration.

2012 – 2015 

He comfortably made it to the last 16 of the 2012 World Championship by beating Darin Young and Scott Rand, 3–1 and 4–1 respectively. However, he struggled against world number four Gary Anderson in the next round, losing 1–4 as his opponent averaged 100. In April, Lloyd dropped out of the world's top 16 for the first time in over a decade and will need to qualify for the upcoming major events if he does not regain his place. In his next major event, the UK Open, Lloyd posted an encouraging result by defeating reigning champion James Wade 9–5, but then lost to world number 48 Joe Cullen 8–9 in the last 32. Lloyd hit a nine-dart finish in the first round of the European Tour Event 2 during a 6–5 win over Alex Roy. In July, he won the tenth Players Championship of the year, his first ranking title in almost 2 years. He beat Andy Hamilton 6–5 in the final and briefly returned to the top 16. He was ranked 17th at the cut-off point before the World Matchplay, but still qualified due to his position on the ProTour Order of Merit. Lloyd faced Mark Webster in the first round and was defeated 6–10. After all 33 ProTour events of 2012 had been played, Lloyd was 16th on the Order of Merit, which qualified him for the Players Championship Finals where he was beaten by Peter Wright 5–6 in the first round, after being 5–3 ahead.

Lloyd overcame Darin Young and Mark Webster to face Michael van Gerwen in the last 16 of the 2013 World Championship, and was beaten 4–1. He lost 9–8 to Brendan Dolan in the third round of the UK Open. Lloyd lost each of the five opening legs to Van Gerwen in the first round of the World Matchplay but made a fightback to trail just 7–6 before being eliminated 10–7. Lloyd's best result of 2013 was at the Austrian Darts Open where he beat the likes of Andy Hamilton (6–0) and Wes Newton (6–4) to reach the semi-finals and another meeting with Van Gerwen with Lloyd losing 6–2.

He twice came from a set down to level his first round match at 2–2 in the 2014 World Championship against Beau Anderson. Lloyd then missed 11 darts in the final set to break throw as all ten legs went with throw to send the match into a sudden-death leg which Anderson won to eliminate Lloyd. Lloyd missed out on playing in the UK Open for the first time in the tournament's history this year as he only entered three of the six qualifying events and failed to advance beyond the last 64 in any of them. Lloyd also failed to qualify for both the World Matchplay and World Grand Prix for the first time in 2014. He could not get past the last 64 of any event he entered during the season. Lloyd failed to qualify for the 2015 World Championship as he was 35th on the Order of Merit before the event, outside of the top 32 who automatically earn their places, and was not successful via any other method of qualification; it marked the first World Championship since 1999 to not feature Lloyd, and he vowed to retire if his poor form continued into 2015, saying "I'm not going to say I'm finished yet, because I think I'm far from finished. But this is the worst year I've ever had. It's been an abysmal year. If I get six months into next year and feel I'm not competing at the level I want to, then that will be the time to take a step back". He began 2015 as the world number 41. However, his form did not improve as he could not qualify for a single major tournament and only advanced to the last 32 once in the 31 events he played in. He dropped to 121st in the world after the 2016 World Championship and announced he would not be entering Q School, although he did not rule out the possibility of attempting to return in the future.

Premier League performances

Lloyd qualified for the first three Premier League tournaments between 2005 and 2007 – the tournament was restricted to the top six ranked players in the PDC and one wildcard in 2005 and 2006, while in 2007, it was restricted to the top six ranked players in the PDC and two wildcards. In 2005, he finished second after the league stage but lost to Taylor in the final. In 2006, Lloyd went out to eventual winner Taylor in the semi finals, then finished 5th in the league stage in 2007. Due to his slip in rankings, he failed to get invited to the Premier League since then.

World Championship results

PDC

 2000: First round (lost to Shayne Burgess 0–3)
 2001: First round (lost to John Part 0–3)
 2002: Semi-finals (lost to Peter Manley 4–6)
 2003: Third round (lost to Chris Mason 1–5)
 2004: Fourth round (lost to Wayne Mardle 3–4)
 2005: Quarter-finals (lost to Wayne Mardle 4–5)
 2006: First round (lost to Gary Welding 2–3)
 2007: Second round (lost to Raymond van Barneveld 3–4)
 2008: First round (lost to Jan van der Rassel 2–3)
 2009: First round (lost to Jelle Klaasen 0–3)
 2010: Third round (lost to Ronnie Baxter 1–4)
 2011: Second round (lost to Mark Hylton 2–4)
 2012: Third round (lost to Gary Anderson 1–4)
 2013: Third round (lost to Michael van Gerwen 1–4)
 2014: First round (lost to Beau Anderson 2–3)

Career finals

PDC major finals: 5 (2 titles, 3 runners-up)

BDO major final: 1 (1 runner-up)

Performance timeline

References

External links
 Colin Lloyd's Official Website

English darts players
1973 births
Living people
Professional Darts Corporation former tour card holders
World Matchplay (darts) champions
World Grand Prix (darts) champions